The Vasari Corridor is an elevated enclosed passageway in Florence, central Italy, connecting the Palazzo Vecchio with the Palazzo Pitti. Beginning on the south side of the Palazzo Vecchio, it joins the Uffizi Gallery and leaves on its south side, crossing the Lungarno dei Archibusieri, then following the north bank of the River Arno until it crosses the river at Ponte Vecchio. At the time of construction, the corridor had to be built around the Torre dei Mannelli, using brackets, because the tower's owners refused to alter it. The corridor conceals part of the façade of the Church of Santa Felicità. It then snakes its way over rows of houses in the Oltrarno district, becoming narrower, to finally join the Palazzo Pitti. The corridor's full length is approximately one kilometre.

In 2016, the corridor was closed for safety reasons and was set to re-open for tourists on 27 May 2022, marking the anniversary of the 1993 Via dei Georgofili bombing, after an 11-month renovation.

History and overview
The Vasari Corridor was built in five months by order of Duke Cosimo I de' Medici in 1565, to the design of Giorgio Vasari. It was commissioned in connection with the marriage of Cosimo's son, Francesco, with Johanna of Austria. The idea of an enclosed passageway was motivated by the Grand Duke's desire to move freely between his residence and the government palace, when, like most monarchs of the period, he felt insecure in public, in his case especially because he had replaced the Republic of Florence. The meat market of Ponte Vecchio was moved to avoid its smell reaching into the passage, and its place taken by the goldsmith shops that still occupy the bridge. At the latter extremity, the corridor was forced to pass around the Mannelli Tower, after the staunch opposition of that family to its destruction.

In the middle of Ponte Vecchio, the corridor is characterized by a series of panoramic windows facing the Arno, in the direction of the Ponte Santa Trinita. In 1939, these replaced the original windows, by order of Benito Mussolini. The larger windows were installed for an official visit to Florence by Adolf Hitler to give him a panoramic view of the river.

After the Ponte Vecchio the corridor passes over the loggiato of the church of Santa Felicita; at that point it had a balcony, protected by a thick railing, looking into the interior of the church, to allow the Grand Duke's family to follow services without mixing with the populace.

In its Uffizi section, the Vasari Corridor is used to exhibit the museum's famous collection of self-portraits.

The area closest to the Uffizi entrance was heavily damaged by a bombing commissioned by the Italian mafia on the night of 27 May 1993. When a car bomb was detonated next to the Torre dei Pulci, between via Lambertesca and via de' Georgofili, this section of the Uffizi Gallery was among the buildings damaged, and several artworks in the corridor were destroyed. These paintings, some hopelessly damaged, have been pieced back together and returned to their original positions to serve as a reminder of the event.

See also
 Passetto di Borgo, Rome
 Passages for Maria Maddalena de' Medici ( the ), also in Florence

References

External links
 

Buildings and structures completed in 1564
Buildings and structures in Florence
Giorgio Vasari buildings
Skyways
Uffizi
Oltrarno